Here Comes the Man with the Jive is a drug-themed jazz song. It was and composed by Leroy "Stuff" Smith and Jack Palmer.

Recordings
Smith recorded the song with his orchestra, Stuff Smith and his Onyx Club Boys, for Vocalion on August 21, 1936.

Theme
Although the title of the song refers to a type of African-American slang (Jive, slang for marijuana) the lyrics explicitly talk about "vipers" (Marijuana users) and encourages the listener to "light up" and "get real high".

See also

 Reefer Songs

References

1932 in cannabis
1932 songs
Cab Calloway songs
Jazz songs
Songs about cannabis